Surapong Chutimawong was a Thai footballer. He competed in the men's tournament at the 1956 Summer Olympics.

References

External links
 

Year of birth missing
Possibly living people
Surapong Chutimawong
Surapong Chutimawong
Surapong Chutimawong
Footballers at the 1956 Summer Olympics
Place of birth missing
Association football defenders